Coonalpyn may refer to.

Coonalpyn, South Australia, a town and locality
Coonalpyn Downs, the official name for the Ninety Mile Desert
Coonalpyn Lutheran Church, a church in South Australia
Coonalpyn Primary School  - refer List of schools in South Australia

See also
District Council of Coonalpyn Downs